Lecanodiaspis microcribraria is a species of scale insect of the family Lecanodiaspididae. It was described in 1915 by Australian entomologist W.W. Froggatt.

References

Insects described in 1915
Lecanodiaspididae